The Roman Catholic Diocese of Rulenge–Ngara is a diocese located in Rulenge in the Ecclesiastical province of Mwanza in Tanzania.

History
 April 8, 1929: Established as Apostolic Vicariate of Bubuka from the Diocese of Tabora and Apostolic Vicariate of Uganda in Uganda
 1951: Promoted as Diocese of Bukoba
 June 21, 1960: Renamed as Diocese of Rulenge
 August 14, 2008: Renamed as Diocese of Rulenge–Ngara

Bishops
 Vicars Apostolic of Bukoba (Roman rite)
 Bishop Burkard Huwiler, M. Afr. (1929.03.18 – 1946.03.20)
 Bishop Lorenzo Tétrault, M. Afr. (1947.11.13 – 1951.03.20)
 Bishop Alfred Lanctôt, M. Afr. (1951.12.13 – 1953.03.25 see below)
 Bishops of Bukoba (Roman rite)
 Bishop Alfred Lanctôt, M. Afr. (see above 1953.03.25 – 1960.06.21 see below)
 Bishops of Rulenge (Roman rite)
 Bishop Alfred Lanctôt, M. Afr. (see above 1960.06.21 – 1969.05.30)
 Bishop Christopher Mwoleka (1969.06.26 – 1996.11.08)
 Bishop Severine Niwemugizi (1996.11.08 - 2008.08.14 see below)
 Bishops of Rulenge–Ngara (Roman rite)
 Bishop Severine Niwemugizi (see above since 2008.08.14)

Auxiliary Bishop
Christopher Mwoleka (1969), appointed Bishop here

Other priests of this diocese who became bishops
Placidus Gervasius Nkalanga, O.S.B. (priest here, 1950-1961), appointed auxiliary bishop of Bukoba in 1961 (professed in O.S.B. in 1984)
Protase Rugambwa, appointed Bishop of Kigoma in 2008

See also
Roman Catholicism in Tanzania

Further reading
Protase Rugambwa: Ministry and collaboration in small Christian communities: ″Communities in Rulenge Diocese-Tanzania, a case study″. Theological dissertation, Pontificia Università Lateranense, Rome, 1998.

Sources
 GCatholic.org
 Catholic Hierarchy
 Website of the Catholic Diocese of Rulenge–Ngara 

Rulenge-Ngara
Christian organizations established in 1929
Roman Catholic dioceses and prelatures established in the 20th century
Rulenge-Ngara, Roman Catholic Diocese of